Gennadij Timoscenko (born 27 April 1949), is a Russian and Slovak chess Grandmaster (GM) (1980).

Biography
At the turn of the 1970s and 1980s, Gennadij Timoscenko was one of the leading Soviet chess players. He twice appearing in the finals of USSR Chess Championship. 
 in 1978, in Tbilisi he shared 10th-12th place with Boris Gulko and Vladimir Bagirov;
 in 1981, in Frunze he ranked in 17th place.

Also Gennadij Timoscenko won two silver medal in Russian Chess Championships: in 1972 and 1976. In 1979, in Tashkent he won Soviet Army Chess Championship.

From 1982 to 1986 Gennadij Timoscenko was one of Garry Kasparov's coaches. In 1993 he settled in Slovakia, and from the following year Gennadij Timoscenko represents this country in the international chess tournaments.

Gennadij Timoscenko has achieved many successes in international chess tournaments, winning or sharing first places among others in Rimavská Sobota (1974), Polanica-Zdrój (1976, Rubinstein Memorial), Varna (1977), Słupsk (1979), Helsinki (1986, together with Jón Loftur Árnason), London (1992, together with Jon Speelman), Šaľa (1994), Starý Smokovec (1996), Bolzano (1998), Seefeld (1998, 1999), Padua (1998, 2000 from Erald Dervishi), Cutro (2000), Graz (2003) and in Opatija (2003). In 2010 and 2011 he twice in row won bronze medals in European Senior Chess Championship in S60 age group (players over 60 years old). In 2011, in Opatija he also won the bronze medal in World Senior Chess Championship in the same age category.

Gennadij Timoscenko played for Slovakia in the Chess Olympiads:
 In 1996, at second board in the 32nd Chess Olympiad in Yerevan (+3, =5, -4),
 In 2000, at third board in the 34th Chess Olympiad in Istanbul (+5, =6, -1),
 In 2002, at third reserve board in the 35th Chess Olympiad in Bled (+4, =6, -1),
 In 2004, at reserve board in the 36th Chess Olympiad in Calvià (+3, =6, -1),
 In 2006, at third board in the 37th Chess Olympiad in Turin (+3, =4, -2).

Gennadij Timoscenko played for Slovakia in the European Team Chess Championship:
 In 1997, at third board in the 11th European Team Chess Championship in Pula (+3, =6, -0) and won individual bronze medal,
 In 2001, at third board in the 13th European Team Chess Championship in León (+2, =2, -3).

In 1976, he was awarded the FIDE International Master (IM) title and received the FIDE Grandmaster (GM) title in 1980.

References

External links

Gennadij Timoscenko chess games at 365chess.com

1949 births
Living people
Sportspeople from Chelyabinsk
Russian chess players
Soviet chess players
Slovak chess players
Chess grandmasters
Chess Olympiad competitors